Dynamopodinae is a very small subfamily of Scarabaeidae or scarab beetles, with only seven species in a single genus, Orubesa.

Distribution 
The seven known species occur in northern Africa and central Asia. There is single species described in Russia — Orubesa athleta Semenov, 1896 [= Dynamopus athleta].

References

External links 
 Subfamily Dynamopodinae (Scarabaeidae: Dynamopodinae) - Atlas of scarab beetles of Russia
New catalogue of Palaearctic Coleoptera (Vol. 3)

Scarabaeidae